David Boll (born May 5, 1953) is an American former cyclist. He competed in the individual road race event at the 1976 Summer Olympics.

References

External links
 

1953 births
Living people
American male cyclists
Olympic cyclists of the United States
Cyclists at the 1976 Summer Olympics
Sportspeople from Hackensack, New Jersey